Vasile Lucaciu National College is a public day school for students aged 10 to 19, established in 1962 and located in Baia Mare, Romania. The college is named after Vasile Lucaciu, a Greek Catholic priest and advocate.

It includes a gymnasium as well as a high school.

Former names

 Medium School No. 3 between 1962 and 1965
 High School No. 3 between 1965 and 1971
 High School Mathematics and Physics No. 1 between 1971 and 1982
 Industrial High School No. 8 between 1982 and 1990
 Vasile Lucaciu High School between 1990 and 1999
 Vasile Lucaciu National College since 1999

Educational institutions established in 1962
Schools in Maramureș County
Buildings and structures in Baia Mare
National Colleges in Romania
1962 establishments in Romania